Mount Catherine, locally known as Gabal Katrîne, is the highest mountain in Egypt. It is located near the city of Saint Catherine in the South Sinai Governorate.

The name is derived from the Christian tradition that angels transported to this mountain the body of the martyred Saint Catherine of Alexandria.

History

Archaeology 
On the north of Mount Catherine, archaeologists uncovered a cave with paintings of people and animals in red pigment dates back to the Chalcolithic Period, circa 5th–4th millennium BC in January of 2020. According to John Darnell, red painted images are not as common as engraved images and text. The painting resembling a camel shows that at least some of the graffiti is not older than the first millennium BC and may belong to later period. The cave was filled with graffiti from different periods over time.

See also
 Saint Catherine's Monastery
 Mount Sinai
 List of Ultras of Africa
 List of elevation extremes by country

Notes

References

External links
 "Gebel Katherîna, Egypt" on Peakbagger
 "Jabal-Katherina" on Snow-forecast.com

Catherine
Catherine
Catherine